Bosse Lindquist (born 1954) is a Swedish radio and TV producer and writer. Since 2012, he directs investigative documentaries for Swedish Television's documentary department. From 2007 to 2009, Lindquist was head of the national radio broadcaster Swedish Radio’s documentary department. He was Ander Visiting Professor of Global Media Studies at Karlstad University from 2012 to 2013. He has been a non-fiction author and director of documentaries since 1988.

Career
A series of documentaries on the state of modern genetics and prenatal diagnostics -  Mechanics of Live – won the Prix Futura (now renamed Prix Europa) in Berlin 1995, and was also rewarded with the Ikarosprice for 1993 and the Association of Swedish Investigative Journalists prize for 1993. The radio-documentary The Rebels – about an extreme and secret Swedish maoist group got the Ikarosprize 1997 and together with Swedish Eugenics– about Sweden’s forced sterilization of women for eugenic reasons–  the Vilhelm Moberg grant in 1997. Bring the Jews Last - produced by Mikael Cohen - got a special commendation at Prix Italia 1998 as well as the prize of the law and history faculties of the Stockholm university 1998. The Silence of Phnom Penh – about Swedish support of the Pol Pot regime and  also produced by Mikael Cohen – won the Prix Europa in Berlin 2000, the Association of Swedish Investigative Journalists prize and the Ikarosprize for 1999. One TV documentary and one radio documentary about adoption from South Korea to Sweden received special commendations at Prix Europa 2002.

A number of documentaries and books have been translated and broadcast in the UK, Germany, France, Denmark, Norway, Finland and Japan.

In 2009, Lindquist's film about Nobel laureate Carleton Gajdusek, who discovered the Kuru disease among a cannibal tribe in New Guinea and who also was a self-proclaimed pedophile, premiered on BBC Storyville. A co-production between, among others, BBC, Arte, SVT, NRK and DR was broadcast for the first time in 2009 by the BBC. The film was officially selected for the IDFA in Amsterdam 2009, and was later shown at documentary festivals in Melbourne, Reykjavik, Thessaloniki, Bergen and Planete Doc Warszaw, among others.

Lindquist has introduced a new format for translated radio - RadioVideo. The new technique makes it possible to download radio programs with sub-titles for the computer, mpeg3 player and cell-phone.

May 2010, Lindquist released an investigation into systematic malpractices within the McDonald's Corporation. The documentary McCheat & Co was produced for SVT - Sveriges Television – and showed systematic practicing of hour-shaving off its employees meagre salaries in Sweden and the United States.

The documentary, WikiRebels was produced together with Jesper Huor for SVT and traced WikiLeaks unprecedented road to achievement, fame and notoriety, interviewing Julian Assange and Daniel Domscheit-Berg among others, as well as tracing WikiLeaks usage of the unprecedented US leaks on Iraq, Afghanistan and diplomacy. The films has been shown in 30 countries worldwide and has spread widely on the internet.

Give Us the Money was part of the Why Poverty series of documentaries, broadcast worldwide by BBC, SVT, Arte, PBS and more than 70 other countries . The film received a 2012 Peabody Award and traces rock musicians Bono and Bob Geldof's decade long lobbying and advocacy against extreme poverty in Africa.

Double Bookkeeping exposed financial and auditing mispractices and illegalities at global forestry giant Stora Enso, 2013, and "Car Burning as Job Hunting" - on urban riots in Swedish suburbs 2014.

In January 2016, Lindquist's trilogy The Experiments exposed scientific fraud and experimentation on humans. The series investigates Swiss surgeon Paolo Macchiarini's claims to having invented plastic organs with which he purportedly saved terminally ill patients. Six out of eight of the "saved" patients have died. One is still alive, but suffering from enormous injuries. Scientific, legal and medical repercussions are unfolding in Sweden, Russia, Italy and several other countries. The trilogy was broadcast in the UK as part of the BBC's Storyville series in October 2016 as Fatal Experiments: The Downfall of a Supersurgeon.

Production

Published 
 Förädlade svenskar, Alfabeta 1991
 Rullstol och varm korv, with Walter Hirsch, Publisher: LL-förlaget, 1991. Translated into German 1995.
 Kärlek i vått och torrt, with Walter Hirsch, Publisher: LL-förlaget, 1993. Translated into German 1995.
 Genguiden, with Robert Nyberg, Publisher: Alfabeta 1995
 Hakkors och skinnskallar - rasism från Auschwitz till Vålberg, with Kurdo Baksi, Robert Blombäck & Susanne Berglind, Publisher: LL-förlaget 1998.
 ”Om rasistiska brott i nyheterna”, in Vita redaktioner, mörk magi, Ylva Brune ed, Publisher: Carlssons 1998.
 Macchiarini affären - om sanningar och lögner på Karolinska, Publisher: Albert Bonniers, 2018

Television documentaries 
 Once, I was Korean, 2002 (Director, with film-maker Bo Öhlén)
 Vad är det för fel på Socialen? 2003 (Exec. producer)
 In the Name of God – on the Church and the Rwandan genocide 2004 (Exec. producer)
 The Rebels 2005 (Director)
 Feminism in the Social-Democrat Party 2006 (Exec. producer)
 The Genius and the Boys, 2009 (Director)
 McCheat & Co,  2010 (Director)
 WikiRebels, 2010 (Director, with co-producer Jesper Huor)
 Give Us the Money, 2012
 Experimenten / Fatal Experiments: The Downfall of a Supersurgeon, 2016

Radio documentaries 
 Vällingby i Afrika, 1988
 Förädlade svenskar - rashygien och sterilisering, 1990
 Bland tinnar och torn, 1992
 Prinsessans fängelse, 1996
 Aftonbladet och hotbilderna, 2000
 The series Livets mekano - om genetik, slump och miljö:
 En forskardröm, 1993
 Blodsband, 1993
 Vem ska få leva?, 1993
 The series En vit fläck på kartan - om ett vitt paradis i Afrika:
 Pionjärer, 1995
 Friherrinnans fristad, 1995
 Den gränslöse kolonisatören, 1995
 The series Svarta Sverige - om främlingsfientlighet i Sverige:
 Statslös Lucia, 1996
 Invandrare, född i Vålberg, 1996
 The series En studie i borgerlighet - om svenska maoister:
 Östern är röd, 1997
 Elitpartiet, 1997
 Rebellerna / The Rebels, 1997
 The series Flyktingströmmar från nazi-Tyskland till Sverige:
 Ta judarna sist/Bring the Jews last, 1998
 Sverige och de baltiska SS-männen, 1998
 The series about Sweden and the Khmer Rouge:
 Tystnaden i Phnom Pehn / The silence of Phnom Penh, 1999
 I revolutionens hjärta, 1999
 The series Adoption:
 Varför är jag här?, 2002
 Svensk adoption, 2002

References

Sources 
 Swedish Radio Documentary dept Swedish Radio Documentary Dept.
 SVT Swedish television Documentary Department SVT Dokumentär
 Ordfront Magazine 
 Karlstad University

External links 
Bosse Lindquist at the Swedish Film Database

1954 births
Living people
Swedish journalists
Swedish non-fiction writers
Swedish documentary filmmakers